Dan Horsley (born 20 July 1972) is an Australian cricketer. He played one first-class match for New South Wales in 2000/01.

See also
 List of New South Wales representative cricketers

References

External links
 

1972 births
Living people
Australian cricketers
New South Wales cricketers
Cricketers from Sydney